Eurovision Choir of the Year 2017 was the first Eurovision Choir competition for choral singers, which was organised by the European Broadcasting Union (EBU) and Interkultur. It was held on 22 July 2017, at the Arena Riga, in the Latvian capital, Riga. The event was produced by Latvian host broadcaster Latvijas Televīzija (LTV) and the Riga Tourism Development Bureau.

Nine countries participated, including Wales, which marked the second time that the United Kingdom has not participated as a unified state in any of the Eurovision Network events, after 1994, when Wales participated lastly in Jeux Sans Frontières. Carmen Manet of Slovenia won the contest, with Wales and hosts Latvia placing second and third respectively.

Location

Latvia hosted its first Eurovision network event since the Eurovision Song Contest 2003, which took place at Skonto Hall in Riga.

Venue
On 14 February 2017, it was confirmed that the inaugural contest would take place at the Arena Riga, located in the Latvian capital. The arena is primarily used for ice hockey, basketball and concerts. Riga Arena holds a maximum of 14,500 and was completed in 2006. It was built to be used as one of the venues for the 2006 IIHF World Championship, the other being Skonto Arena. It has been home to the Kontinental Hockey League club Dinamo Riga since 2008. During the years the Arena has also hosted many well-known artists from all over the world. The arena hosted the 'D' group of Eurobasket 2015.

Format
Competing countries who are members of the European Broadcasting Union (EBU) are eligible to participate in Eurovision Choir. Nine countries participated at the inaugural event. Each competing country was represented by a professional choir, and each performed a choral piece lasting no more than six minutes in length. Each piece may include singular or several musical works or of a free genre; but must contain national or regional influence from the participating country.

Tickets for the event went on sale on 15 March 2017. The winning choir (Slovenia) received the title of Eurovision Choir of the Year 2017 and prize money from Riga City Council. The event was opened with a performance of "Fly to Paradise" by host Whitacre, with over 500 singers on stage and Jolanta Strikaite in the arena and closed with Ēriks Ešenvalds’ "My Song", performed by all the choirs, with the Festival Stage Choir, Dāvis Jurka and the live audience.

Presenters
Announced on 27 February 2017, Grammy-winning composer and conductor Eric Whitacre and LTV culture presenter Eva Johansone, were the hosts for the inaugural contest that took place on 22 July 2017, in Riga, Latvia.

Participating countries

On 27 February 2017, the EBU confirmed that seven countries would be participating in the inaugural contest.

Conductors
The conductors for each country are as follows:

  – Alexander Koller
  – Philippe Favette
  – Ole Faurschou
  – Aarne Saluveer
  – Bertrand Gröger
  – Lakner Tamás
  – Līga Celma-Kursiete
  – Primož Kerštanj
  – Islwyn Evans

International broadcasts and voting

Commentators 
Most countries sent commentators to Riga or commentated from their own country, in order to add insight to the participants.

Professional jury
The winner of the contest is decided upon the votes from a professional jury, which is made up of the following:
  – Elīna Garanča (mezzo-soprano)
  – John Rutter (composer)
  – Nicolas Fink (conductor)

Other countries
For a country to be eligible for potential participation in Eurovision Choir, it needs to be an active member of the European Broadcasting Union (EBU).  It is currently unknown whether the EBU issue invitations of participation to all 56 active members like they do for the Eurovision Song Contest.

  – On 5 September 2016, Norwegian national broadcaster NRK announced that they would not be making their debut at the 2017 contest due to their existing involvement in Let the Peoples Sing, another EBU competition.
  – On 29 May 2017, Swedish national broadcaster SVT announced that they would not be making their debut at the 2017 contest.

See also 
 ABU International Dance Festival 2017
 Eurovision Song Contest 2017
 Eurovision Young Dancers 2017
 Junior Eurovision Song Contest 2017

References

External links 
 

2017 in Latvia
Eurovision Choir
Events in Riga